This is a list of the French Singles & Airplay Chart Reviews number-ones of 1968.

Summary

Singles Chart

See also
1968 in music
List of number-one hits (France)

References

1968 in France
France singles
1968